News18 Odia is an Odia news channel. It is owned by Network 18, which launched on May 4, 2015. Its tagline is `News is Life’. ETV News Odia is a part of the ETV News Network, one of the largest satellite television channels in India. ETV News Odia is the 10th regional news channel of the ETV News Network in India. Nilambar Rath was the channel's first editor.

List of programmes
Chhota Mora Gaonti
Sidha Katha
Abhula Gita
E-Cafe
Kana Kala Ma
Crime Bureau
Mantra Mahima
Kathare Kathare
Annadata
Hakim Babu
My Doctor
Aapananka Bhagya

Editors
Nilambar Rath (May 2015 to November 2015)
Bhakta Tripathy (January 2016 to October 2016)
Satyaprakash Nayak (March 2017 to December 2017)
Dayanidhi Dash (present editor)

See also
List of Odia-language television channels

References

Odia-language television channels
Privately held companies of India
Television channels and stations established in 2015
Television stations in Bhubaneswar
2015 establishments in Odisha
24-hour television news channels in India